Frederick VI (30 July 1769 – 2 April 1829) reigned as Landgrave of Hesse-Homburg from 1820 until his death in 1829.

Biography
Born in Homburg, Hesse, on 30 July 1769, Friedrich Joseph Ludwig Carl August was the eldest son of the incumbent Landgrave of Hesse-Homburg, Frederick V, and his wife Caroline of Hesse-Darmstadt, the eldest child of the then Landgrave of Hesse-Darmstadt, Louis IX.

Frederick was appointed a captain of the Russian cavalry in 1783 and was made an Austrian general during the Great French War. For his services in that conflict, he was created a Commander of the Austrian Military Order of Maria Theresa.

Despite the vocal objections of her mother, Charlotte of Mecklenburg-Strelitz, Frederick married Princess Elizabeth of the United Kingdom, the third daughter of King George III, in the Queen's House in the Mall (now integrated into Buckingham Palace) on 7 April 1818. It was no love match: Elizabeth longed to be free from her domineering mother at any cost, while Frederick needed her sizeable dowry to improve the Landgraviate's strained finances. As Elizabeth was over the age of 48 at the time of their marriage, this union produced no offspring.

Landgrave Frederick V died on 20 January 1820; Frederick succeeded him as monarch of the  principality. The new Landgrave struggled to repay his father's exorbitant debts. Nine years into his reign, the Landgrave died of complications from a pre-existing leg wound. He was succeeded by his brother, Louis William.

Ancestry

References
Fraser, Flora: Princesses: The Six Daughters of George III, John Murray, 2004, London,

Citations

 

1769 births
1829 deaths
Frederick VI
Austrian generals
Austrian Empire commanders of the Napoleonic Wars
Commanders Cross of the Military Order of Maria Theresa